An unbarred spiral galaxy is a type of spiral galaxy without a central bar, or one that is not a barred spiral galaxy.  It is designated with an SA in the galaxy morphological classification scheme.

Barless spiral galaxies are one of three general types of spiral galaxies under the de Vaucouleurs system classification system, the other two being intermediate spiral galaxy and barred spiral galaxy. Under the Hubble tuning fork, it is one of two general types of spiral galaxy, the other being barred spirals.

Grades

Unbarred lenticular galaxy 
An unbarred lenticular galaxy is a lenticular version of an unbarred spiral galaxy. They have the Hubble type of  SA0.

An example of this is the galaxy, AM 0644-741. For other examples see :Category:Unbarred lenticular galaxies.

References

 

Galaxy morphological types